Elmer Township may refer to the following places in the United States:

 Elmer Township, Oscoda County, Michigan
 Elmer Township, Sanilac County, Michigan
 Elmer Township, Pipestone County, Minnesota
 Elmer Township, St. Louis County, Minnesota

Township name disambiguation pages